Thomas Wayne Fletcher (June 28, 1942 – May 9, 2018) was an American professional baseball player and former Major League pitcher, a left-hander who appeared in one game with the Detroit Tigers in . He attended the University of Illinois at Urbana–Champaign, where he was a 1962 College Baseball All-America Team selection.

Fletcher was born in Elmira, New York in 1942. That year, his father, Glen, was playing minor league baseball in Elmira with the Elmira Pioneers.

Detroit recalled him in September when rosters expanded to 40 men, and on the 12th, he made his MLB debut at Tiger Stadium. Entering a game against the Boston Red Sox with Detroit trailing, 6–2, he pitched the eighth and ninth innings, allowing two bases on balls, one hit, and a wild pitch, but he held the Bosox off the scoreboard. He struck out one hitter, pitcher Mike Fornieles. His line during those two innings pitched ultimately constituted his big-league statisical legacy.

Within two weeks of his Major League debut, Fletcher was admitted to Henry Ford Hospital with the left side of his body paralyzed. He was diagnosed with thrombophlebitis and missed the entire 1963 season. When he returned to baseball, his arm was much weaker and the Tigers released him after parts of five more minor league seasons.

He signed with the Minnesota Twins to finish the 1968 minor league season but told Sports Illustrated that he would retire and return home to Illinois to finish his degree if he was not selected in the 1968 Major League Baseball expansion draft. He would not be selected in the expansion draft and 1968 would be his final professional baseball season.

His son Darrin, a catcher, had a 14-season, 1,245-game MLB career for four clubs and was a 1994 National League All-Star.

Tom Fletcher died in Oakwood, Illinois, on May 9, 2018.

References

External links

Pelota Binaria (Venezuelan Winter League)

1942 births
2018 deaths
All-American college baseball players
Baseball players from New York (state)
Cardenales de Lara players
American expatriate baseball players in Venezuela
Denver Bears players
Detroit Tigers players
Illinois Fighting Illini baseball players
Knoxville Smokies players
Lakeland Tigers players
Major League Baseball pitchers
Montgomery Rebels players
Sportspeople from Elmira, New York
Rocky Mount Leafs players
Syracuse Chiefs players
Tacoma Cubs players
Toledo Mud Hens players
Baseball players from Illinois